Donetsk Railway station is a railway station in Donetsk, Ukraine. It lies between Rutchenkove railway station to the south, and a junction towards Avdiivka on the northwest and Yasynuvata on the northeast, via Donetsk-Pivnichnyi railway station.

History
In World War II the station building was completely destroyed. In 1951, the architect Vorontsov designed a new station, with a central hub and spurs. The lobby in the centre is key to its design. The station square was built in the 1960s.

The station houses a museum of the history of the Donetsk Railway, opened on 4 August 2000, on its 130th anniversary. Outside there is a statue to St. Nicholas, consecrated by the Russian Orthodox Church in late 2011. To accommodate the European Football Championship 2012 the station building was reconstructed and expanded, in a more modern style.

On 21 May 2012 a new building was commissioned. the New complex consists of main, commuter and transit platforms, two shopping malls, two concourses and a new bus station. The pedestrian overbridge was redesigned to be indoors with escalators.

There are around 200 lights,  of signaling cable,  of overhead line, upgrades to the two existing electrical substations and installation of two new ones.

In 2014 the station building was damaged during the War in Donbass.

Trains
No long-distance trains pass or terminate at Donetsk, because of the ongoing conflict. Four trains operated by the self-proclaimed Donetsk People's Republic pass the station. 
 Ilovaisk — Yasynuvata (via Donetsk)
 Donetsk — Uspenskaya (via Ilovaisk)
 Ilovaysk — Olenivka (via Donetsk)
 Yasynuvata — Luhansk (via Donetsk)

Photos

References

External links
 Website of Donetsk Railway 

Railway stations in Donetsk Oblast
Donetsk
Railway stations opened in 1872